The Munk School of Global Affairs and Public Policy at the University of Toronto is an interdisciplinary academic centre with various research and educational programs committed to the field of globalization. Located in Toronto, Ontario, it offers master's degrees in global affairs and public policy, as well as in European, Russian and Asia-Pacific studies. The school is a member of the Association of Professional Schools of International Affairs (APSIA), a group of schools that educate students in international affairs. Admission to the Munk School is highly competitive; the Master of Global Affairs program typically receives between 500 and 600 applicants per year but offers only 80 first-year places. 

The Munk School is located in the north and south wings of the Devonshire House building on Devonshire Place, which is shared with Trinity College's John W. Graham Library. In 2012, the school opened a second location in the Observatory building at 315 Bloor Street West (formerly the university's Admissions and Awards building), which houses the offices of the Citizen Lab and the Master of Global Affairs program.

History

Founded in 2000 as the Munk Centre for International Studies, it was named after Canadian businessman and philanthropist Peter Munk, who made a $6.4 million donation to finance the construction. It occupies the historic Devonshire House, a former residential hall of the university's Trinity College, and opened a second location in 2012 at 315 Bloor Street West after an $80 million collective contribution from the Peter and Melanie Munk Foundation, the Government of Canada and the Government of Ontario.

The school was criticized by students and faculty for accepting $35 million from Peter Munk and for the terms of agreement between the school and Peter Munk. The Canadian Foreign Policy Institute stated that Peter Munk's far-right views were incompatible with the mandate of the school. Paul Hamel and John Valleau, faculty members at the University of Toronto, stated that the agreement will reduce academic independence, permit the Munk family to shape the academic work, and allow the Munk family to determine the university's priorities in place of the faculty and students,. Additionally, several students and faculty criticized the decision to name the school after Munk, citing allegations of environmental damage and human rights violations by Barrick Gold in foreign countries. The mining company was founded by Munk and was the principal source of his wealth.

On April 6, 2018, the University of Toronto announced that the Munk School of Global Affairs would merge with the university's School of Public Policy and Governance to become the Munk School of Global Affairs and Public Policy. The merger took effect on July 1, 2018. The School of Public Policy and Governance was a public policy and public administration school that was founded in 2006. The Master of Public Policy program and many public policy scholars remain headquartered in the Canadiana Gallery at 14 Queen's Park Crescent West.

The Munk School offers a two-year Master of Public Policy (MPP) program, with a core curriculum emphasizing practical and applied dimensions of policymaking. The program also includes a paid internship during the summer between the first and second years. The school has internship partners that include the Canadian Federal Public Service, the Ontario Public Service, the City of Toronto, the City of Mississauga, as well as many non-governmental organizations and research think tanks. The Munk School housed the Mowat Centre for Policy Innovation – an independent, non-partisan public policy think tank – until the Centre closed in April 2019.

Leadership
The founding director was Janice Stein, who held the position until 2014. The school was then headed by Stephen Toope until 2017, when he became the 346th Vice-Chancellor of the University of Cambridge. After Toope's departure, the interim director was Randall Hansen, who served as head of the School's Centre for European, Russian and Eurasian Studies.

On November 12, 2019, Michael Sabia was named as the Munk School's director, starting in February 2020. He served in that role until December 2020, when he was appointed by the Government of Canada as Deputy Minister of Finance. Professor Cheryl Misak was announced as the interim director of the Munk School, effective December 15, 2020. Peter Loewen was appointed Director in November 2021.

Academics

Master's degrees
The Munk School offers two master's degrees – a Master of Global Affairs (MGA) and a Master of Public Policy (MPP).

The Master of Global Affairs (MGA) program is a two-year interdisciplinary professional degree with curriculum covering global and financial systems, global civil society, and global strategic and security issues. The program requires students to complete a relevant internship with an NGO, an international organization such as the UN or WTO, or at an embassy or consulate abroad. Admission to the MGA is highly selective with 500 to 600 annual applicants for 80 first-year placements. After a general first year of study, students specialize in one of three areas: Global Economy and Markets, Global Civil Society, or Global Institutions. MGA students can also complete their degrees concurrently with an MBA at the Rotman School of Management or with a JD at the University of Toronto Faculty of Law. The Munk School's MGA can also been taken as one half of a duel degree with either Sciences Po, Hertie School of Governance, or the London School of Economics (LSE).

The Master of Public Policy (MPP) program is a two-year professional degree, emphasizing practical and applied dimensions of policymaking. Approximately 80 students are admitted each year. Core courses include micro and macroeconomics, legal analysis, political science and quantitative methods for policy analysis. The curriculum also includes five electives on domestic policy, law, and international policy, taken either at the Munk School or other graduate departments on the University of Toronto campus. The school frequently invites public sector leaders and external researchers to lecture and expose students to senior professionals in government and the broader public, private and community sectors. Students are required to complete an internship during the summer between the first and second year. The school internship partners include the Canadian Federal Public Service, the Ontario Public Service, the City of Toronto, the City of Mississauga, as well as many non-governmental organizations and research think tanks. Second year MPP students can compete for exchanges with partner institutions in Europe and Asia, including The Hertie School of Governance (Berlin), Sciences Po's Paris School of International Affairs (Paris), The Lee Kuan Yew School of Public Policy (Singapore), and the National Graduate Institute for Public Policy (Japan).

Other graduate degrees
The Munk School also offers joint degrees, including the Collaborative Master’s/PhD Program in South Asian Studies, the Collaborative Master’s Program in Asia-Pacific Studies, the Ethnic and Pluralism Studies Collaborative Graduate Program, and the Dynamics of Global Change Collaborative Doctoral Program.

Undergraduate degrees
Established as a degree program in 1985 and as a centre in 2001, the Trudeau Centre for Peace, Conflict and Justice administers the Peace, Conflict and Justice (PCJ) undergraduate programme in the Munk School of Global Affairs and Public Policy. The PCJ programme, while administered by the Munk School, is a joint initiative with the Faculty of Arts & Science. Students are required to take several Arts & Science courses to complete the programme – including in political science, economics, statistics, psychology and international relations, among others. The Centre grew out of the Peace and Conflict Studies programme established by Anatol Rapaport in the early 1980s. In 1990, Thomas Homer-Dixon assumed the Directorship and continued in that role through 2001 when the programme was institutionalized as the Trudeau Centre. Homer-Dixon's Directorship ended in 2007.

In addition to the PCJ programme, the Munk School offers several undergraduate academic programmes through the Faculty of Arts & Science. These include American Studies, Contemporary Asian Studies, European Studies, Hungarian Studies, Public Policy, South Asian Studies, as well as the Munk One Program, a first-year undergraduate seminar series. Unlike the PCJ programme, while these programmes’ courses are taught and syllabi are set by Munk School instructors, the Faculty of Arts & Science administers the programmes and sets rules for enrolment and completion.

Admissions 
Admission to the two-year professional Master of Public Policy program is highly competitive. The school typically receives 600+ applications for only 80 first year spots. Candidates are selected on a holistic basis. At minimum candidates are required to have a four-year bachelor's degree, with a minimum Grade Point Average (GPA) in the final year of undergraduate studies of 3.3 out of a possible 4.0 or a B standing. However, due to the high volume of applications there are many more highly qualified candidates than first year spots and simply meeting the minimum requirements is unlikely to be sufficient to gain admission. The school assesses candidates based on 5 factors: an online application form, a statement of purpose, a resume or curriculum vitae, 2 letters of academic recommendation, and an applicant's academic record. In addition, candidates may provide up to an additional two letters of reference from another source (for example, from an employer or volunteer organization). In determining admission the school considers a strong application one that has a high level of cohesion between the 5 supporting documents and the structure and learning objectives of the MPP program.

Scholarships 
The Cadario Fellowship in Public Policy is an academic and monetary award given to the top students in their second year of the program. The award was created and named after Paul Cadario, a senior manager with the World Bank in Washington and alumnus of the University of Toronto, after he donated $1 million to U of T's School of Public Policy and Governance. MPP students have also been awarded many other prestigious external scholarships and awards, including Cancer Care ON grants, Canadian Institutes of Health Research (CIHR) grants, Ontario Graduate Scholarships (OGS), and Social Sciences and Humanities Research Council (SSHRC) grants.

Student life

Public Policy and Governance Review 
The Public Policy and Governance Review (PPGR) is a biannual publication and blog supported by the University of Toronto School of Public Policy and Governance.

Public Good Initiative 
The Public Good Initiative (PGI) is a student-led project that pairs students from the Munk School of Global Affairs and Public Policy with community organizations that can benefit from pro bono consulting services. The PGI has worked with organizations that include United Way Toronto, Friends of the Greenbelt Foundation, Toronto City Summit Alliance, Maytree Foundation, People for Education, BC Centre for Social Enterprise, Mid Toronto Community Services and the Ontario Association of Food Banks.

Beyond the Headlines 
Beyond the Headlines (BTH) is a weekly radio show that provides fair and balanced analysis of pressing public policy issues in Canada. The one-hour program airs from 11:00 a.m. to 12:00 p.m. EST every Monday on CIUT 89.5FM, the University of Toronto’s campus radio station. BTH is staffed by students (both current and alumni) who are members of the Munk School community. After its first year on the air, BTH was voted “Best New Talk Show” on CIUT 89.5FM. Since its founding in 2012, BTH has interviewed notable politicians, public servants, academics and activists, such as Josh Colle, Lynn Morrison, Mitzie Hunter, Mike Layton, Tony Dean, Daiene Vernile, Laurie Scott, Peter Singer, Garfield Dunlop, Greg Sorbara, Ron Atkey, and Michael Geist.

Cadario Fellowship in Public Policy
The Cadario Fellowship in Public Policy is an academic and monetary award given to the top students in their second year of the program. The award was created and named after Paul Cadario, a senior manager with the World Bank in Washington and alumnus of the University of Toronto, after he donated $1 million to U of T’s School of Public Policy and Governance.

Research centres and labs
  Canada Centre For Global Security Studies
  Centre for European, Russian, and Eurasian Studies
  Centre for the Study of Global Japan
  Centre for the Study of Korea
  Centre for the Study of the United States
  Centre for the Study of France and the Francophone World
  Dr. David Chu Program in Asia-Pacific Studies
  The Bill Graham Centre for Contemporary International History (jointly overseen by Trinity College)
  Trudeau Centre for Peace, Conflict and Justice
Mowat Centre for Policy Innovation (closed 2019)
R.F. Harney Program in Ethnic, Immigration, and Pluralism Studies
 The Andrea and Charles Bronfman Chair in Israeli Studies
 The Global Ideas Institute
 The Global Justice Lab
Citizen Lab

Mowat Centre for Policy Innovation 
The Mowat Centre for Policy Innovation is an independent, non-partisan public policy think tank housed in the Munk School. It undertakes applied public policy research and engages in public dialogue on federal issues important to the prosperity and quality of life of Ontario and Canada. The Mowat Centre has a mandate to propose innovative, research-driven public policy recommendations that work on behalf of Canadians in all regions of the country, including Ontario. The Mowat Centre for Policy Innovation was established in 2009 with $5 Million in seed funding from the Ontario Provincial government. The centre is named after Oliver Mowat, Ontario's longest serving premier and a father of confederation.

Notable faculty 
 Mel Cappe
 Ian D. Clark
 Tony Dean
 Joseph Heath
 Bob Rae
 Ritu Birla

See also 
University of Toronto
Public policy school
Master of Public Policy
Mowat Centre for Policy Innovation

References

External links

 
 Centres and Programmes at the Munk School
University of Toronto School of Public Policy and Governance
2012-13 SPPG brochure
2007-08 SPPG brochure
Public Policy and Governance Review
The Mowat Centre
The Public Policy and Governance Portal
SPPG on Twitter

University of Toronto
Schools of international relations
Journalism fellowships
2000 establishments in Canada